is a former Japanese football player. He is the current assistant manager of Nagoya Grampus.

Playing career
Miki was born in Sagamihara on July 23, 1978. After graduating from high school, he joined J1 League club Bellmare Hiratsuka in 1997. He played many matches as center back. However the club was relegated to J2 League end of 1999 season. In 2000, he moved to J2 club Oita Trinita. He played many matches as center back. In 2002, he became a regular player and the club won the champions and was promoted to J1 from 2003. Although he played as regular player, his opportunity to play decreased in 2007. In 2008, he moved to Nagoya Grampus. However he could hardly play in the match. In 2009, he moved to J2 club Tokushima Vortis. Although he played as regular player until 2011, his opportunity to play decreased from 2012. Although the club was promoted to J1 from 2014, he retired end of 2013 season without playing J1.

Club statistics

References

External links

1978 births
Living people
Association football people from Kanagawa Prefecture
Japanese footballers
J1 League players
J2 League players
Shonan Bellmare players
Oita Trinita players
Nagoya Grampus players
Tokushima Vortis players
Association football defenders